The 1884 Wimbledon Championships took place on the outdoor grass courts at the All England Lawn Tennis Club in Wimbledon, London, United Kingdom. The tournament ran from 5 July until 19 July. It was the 8th staging of the Wimbledon Championships, and the first Grand Slam tennis event of 1884. The men's doubles (previously hosted by the Oxford University Club) and women's singles (originally planned by the London Athletic Club) were added to the Wimbledon Championships, but these were not started until after the men's singles competition had been completed. The first prize for the women was valued at twenty guineas, and the second prize was valued at ten guineas There were thirteen female competitors.  James Dwight, Arthur Rives and Dick Sears from the United States entered the men's singles event and were the first non-British and overseas players to enter the Wimbledon Championships. The South Western Railway ran special trains to the ground from Waterloo and the temporary Stand A at the Centre Court was converted into a permanent and covered stand.

Champions

Men's singles

 William Renshaw defeated  Herbert Lawford 6–0, 6–4, 9–7

Women's singles

 Maud Watson defeated  Lillian Watson 6–8, 6–3, 6–3

Men's doubles

 Ernest Renshaw /  William Renshaw defeated  Ernest Lewis /  Teddy Williams 6–3, 6–1, 1–6, 6–4

References

External links
 Official Wimbledon Championships website

 
Wimbledon Championships
Wimbledon Championships
Wimbledon Championships
July 1884 sports events